Marionia gemmii is a species of sea slug, a dendronotid nudibranch, a marine gastropod mollusc in the family Tritoniidae.

Distribution
This species was described from the Ria de Arousa, NW Spain, . It has been reported from the Mediterranean Sea.

References

Tritoniidae
Gastropods described in 2018